Donald Post (March 14, 1902 – November 17, 1979), dubbed by many as The Godfather of Halloween, created and sold some of the first rubber masks, which remain popular today.

Career
In the 1970s, Post made masks of such actors as Tor Johnson and William Shatner, the latter of which was slightly altered in the 1978 film, Halloween, into the infamous Michael Myers mask.

In the 1980s, Post and his company, Don Post Studios, also produced some of the rarer masks of the classic Cenobites from the Hellraiser franchise, as well as creating the masks used in the movie Halloween III: Season of the Witch. The company is currently owned by the Paper Magic Group.

Notes

External links

1902 births
1979 deaths
Burials at Forest Lawn Memorial Park (Hollywood Hills)
20th-century American businesspeople